Jo Hyu-il (born 1982), better known as The Black Skirts, is an indie rock musician based in South Korea. In 2010, he released his debut album, 201, which won Best Modern Rock Album at the 2010 Korean Music Awards. He has since released the albums, Don't You Worry Baby (I'm Only Swimming) (2011), Team Baby (2017), and Thirsty (2019).

Background 
Jo was born in Seoul, South Korea, on December 5, 1982. He moved to the United States when he was 12 years old and grew up in New Jersey. His musical taste was influenced at an early age by what he would learn from American music media such as MTV and Rolling Stone. He was also heavily influenced by Alanis Morissette's Jagged Little Pill and the first album he ever purchased was Michael Jackson's Dangerous.

Career 
In 2004, Jo formed a three-member punk rock band called Castel Prayon while living in New York City. The band eventually dissolved as members went on to pursue their individual endeavors, leaving Jo to become a one-man band.

In 2006, Jo returned to South Korea and began making music as a one-man band under the name, The Black Skirts. In 2009, Jo released an unofficial album titled My Feet Don't Touch the Ground (And I Am So Winded I Can't Sing for You Today). In 2010, Jo gained notoriety in the Korean indie rock scene upon releasing 201, his first album as The Black Skirts Produced by Kia Eshghi. The album was recorded in his basement. Later that year, he won Best Modern Rock Album at the Korean Music Awards. A special edition of 201 was released on March 18, 2010. On July 13, 2011, Jo released his second album, Don't You Worry Baby (I'm Only Swimming). On January 7, 2016, Jo signed to Highgrnd. On May 30, 2017, Jo released his third album part 1, Team Baby, whose album cover features Jo's parents. He announced that this album is composed of three parts.

In 2018, Jo left Highgrnd and started working under his own company Doggy Rich. On February 12, 2019, Jo released his third album part 2, Thirsty, with his label partner Bespok. Two years later, Jo released an English-language EP titled Good Luck To You, Girl Scout!. The EP was said to be “inspired by my friends who got dumped last summer during the height of Corona Virus.”

Discography

Studio albums

Single albums

Singles

Awards and nominations

References

External links
 
 

South Korean singer-songwriters
South Korean male singers
Korean Music Award winners
South Korean male singer-songwriters